Henry Thompson (1797–1878) was an English cleric and author.

Life
Thompson was born in Surrey, and was admitted to St John's College, Cambridge, as a pensioner on 29 April 1818, graduating B.A. in 1822, and proceeding M.A. in 1825. In 1820 he competed for the Browne Medal, receiving an extra prize for a Latin ode. He was ordained deacon in 1823 and priest in 1827.

After being successively curate of St George's, Camberwell, Surrey (1824–7), of St Mary's, Salehurst, Sussex (1827–8), and of Wrington, Somerset (1828–1853), Thompson was appointed vicar of Chard, Somerset, on 14 September 1853, by George Henry Law. There he resided until his death on 29 November 1878. He was known as a man of conservative instincts.

Works
Thompson was the author of:

 Davidica: twelve practical Sermons on the Life of David, London, 1827
 Pastoralia: a Manual of Helps for the Parochial Clergy, London, 1830; 2nd edit. 1832.
 The Life of Hannah More, London.
 Concionalia: Outlines of Sermons for the Christian Year, London, 1853; 2nd edit. 1862; 2nd ser. 1871.

Thompson published editions of Horace (1853, 8vo), and Virgil (1854; 3rd edit. In 1845 he translated Schiller's Maid of Orleans and William Tell. In 1850 he edited a volume of Original Ballads by living Authors, for which his friend E. A. Freeman, met at Hannah More's house at Barley-Wood, wrote nine poems. He also contributed to Lyra Sanctorum, Lyra Eucharistica and the Churchman's Companion.

He contributed most of the classical articles to the Encyclopædia Metropolitana (1824), some of which he later published separately.

Family
Thompson married in 1823, Anne Harrison Bell, daughter of James Bell, vicar of Lympne, Kent. He left two sons—Henry Bell, vicar of Tatworth, and Christopher.

Notes

External links
Attribution

1797 births
1878 deaths
19th-century English Anglican priests
English classical scholars
People from Surrey
People from Chard, Somerset
People from North Somerset (district)